The 1886–87 international cricket season was from September 1886 to March 1887. The season consisted with only single Test tour by England in Australia.

Season overview

January

England in Australia

References

International cricket competitions by season
1886 in cricket
1887 in cricket